Lake County is a county in the U.S. state of South Dakota. As of the 2020 United States Census, the population was 11,059. Its county seat is Madison. The county was formed in 1873.

Geography
The terrain of Lake County consists of rolling hills, with the area devoted to agriculture. A tributary of the East Fork Vermillion River flows south-southeastward through the lower western part of the county, and Buffalo Creek flows southeastward from the central part of the county, leaving the county near its southeast corner. The terrain generally slopes to the south, although high points (ca. 1,814' ASL) are found on the north and south boundary lines and points between.

Lakes

 Buffalo Slough
 Brant Lake
 Davis Slough
 Gilman Lake
 Green Lake
 Lake Badus
 Lake Herman
 Lake Madison
 Long Lake
 Mud Lake
 Pelican Lake
 Round Lake
 Spring Lake

Protected areas
 Lake Herman State Park
 Walker's Point State Recreation Area

Major highways
 U.S. Highway 81
 South Dakota Highway 19
 South Dakota Highway 34

Adjacent counties

 Brookings County - northeast
 Moody County - east
 Minnehaha County - southeast
 McCook County - southwest
 Miner County - west
 Kingsbury County - northwest

Demographics

2000 census
As of the 2000 United States Census, there were 11,276 people, 4,372 households, and 2,828 families in the county. The population density was 20 people per square mile (8/km2). There were 5,282 housing units at an average density of 9 per square mile (4/km2). The racial makeup of the county was 97.76% White, 0.20% Black or African American, 0.66% Native American, 0.54% Asian, 0.01% Pacific Islander, 0.33% from other races, and 0.51% from two or more races. 0.79% of the population were Hispanic or Latino of any race.

There were 4,372 households, out of which 29.80% had children under the age of 18 living with them, 55.90% were married couples living together, 5.90% had a female householder with no husband present, and 35.30% were non-families. 29.20% of all households were made up of individuals, and 13.30% had someone living alone who was 65 years of age or older.  The average household size was 2.41 and the average family size was 3.00.

The county population contained 23.70% under the age of 18, 15.00% from 18 to 24, 23.40% from 25 to 44, 21.40% from 45 to 64, and 16.30% who were 65 years of age or older. The median age was 36 years. For every 100 females there were 99.80 males. For every 100 females age 18 and over, there were 99.50 males.

The median income for a household in the county was $34,087, and the median income for a family was $43,750. Males had a median income of $28,994 versus $21,084 for females. The per capita income for the county was $16,446. About 5.40% of families and 9.70% of the population were below the poverty line, including 8.60% of those under age 18 and 8.60% of those age 65 or over.

2010 census
As of the 2010 United States Census, there were 11,200 people, 4,483 households, and 2,814 families in the county. The racial makeup of the county was 96.2% white, 0.7% Asian, 0.7% American Indian, 0.5% black or African American, 0.8% from other races, and 1.1% from two or more races. Those of Hispanic or Latino origin made up 1.6% of the population. In terms of ancestry, 50.7% were German, 20.6% were Norwegian, 12.4% were Irish, 6.6% were English, 6.2% were Dutch, 5.0% were Danish, and 5.0% were American.

Of the 4,483 households, 26.7% had children under the age of 18 living with them, 53.0% were married couples living together, 6.8% had a female householder with no husband present, 37.2% were non-families, and 30.9% of all households were made up of individuals. The average household size was 2.30 and the average family size was 2.88. The median age was 39.9 years.

The median income for a household in the county was $45,606 and the median income for a family was $57,753. Males had a median income of $36,370 versus $25,898 for females. The per capita income for the county was $22,447. About 6.5% of families and 12.1% of the population were below the poverty line, including 12.8% of those under age 18 and 8.8% of those age 65 or over.

Communities

City
 Madison (county seat)

Towns
 Brant Lake
 Nunda
 Ramona

Village
 Wentworth

Census-designated places
 Brant Lake South
 Chester
 Graceville Colony
 Lake Madison
 Rustic Acres Colony
 Winfred

Other unincorporated communities
 Franklin
 Junius
 Rutland

Townships

Badus
Chester
Clarno
Concord
Farmington
Franklin
Herman
Lake View
Le Roy
Nunda
Orland
Rutland
Summit
Wayne
Wentworth
Winfred

Historical townsite
 Saranac

Politics
Lake County voters have voted for Republican Party candidates in 62 percent of national elections since 1964.

See also
 National Register of Historic Places listings in Lake County, South Dakota

References

External links
 Official County Website

 
1873 establishments in Dakota Territory
Populated places established in 1873